

Events

January

 January 4 – Korean War: Third Battle of Seoul – Chinese and North Korean forces capture Seoul for the second time (having lost the Second Battle of Seoul in September 1950).
 January 9 – The Government of the United Kingdom announces abandonment of the Tanganyika groundnut scheme for the cultivation of peanuts in the Tanganyika Territory, with the writing off of £36.5M debt.
 January 15 – In a court in West Germany, Ilse Koch, The "Witch of Buchenwald", wife of the commandant of the Buchenwald concentration camp, is sentenced to life imprisonment.
 January 20 – Winter of Terror: Avalanches in the Alps kill 240 and bury 45,000 for a time, in Switzerland, Austria and Italy.
 January 21 – Mount Lamington in Papua New Guinea erupts catastrophically, killing nearly 3,000 people and causing great devastation in Oro Province.
 January 25 – Dutch author Anne de Vries releases the first volume of his children's novel Journey Through the Night (Reis door de nacht), set during World War II.

February
 February – The Convention People's Party wins national elections in Gold Coast (British colony).
 February 1–2 – The 1951 Nepalese revolution leads to agreement for a democratic constitution.
 February 1 – The United Nations General Assembly declares that China is an aggressor in the Korean War, in United Nations General Assembly Resolution 498.
 February 6 – Woodbridge train wreck: A Pennsylvania Railroad passenger train derails near Woodbridge Township, New Jersey, killing 85 people and injuring over 500, in one of the worst rail disasters in American history.
 February 12 – Muhammad Reza Shah marries Soraya Esfandiary-Bakhtiari.
 February 15 – The 1951 New Zealand waterfront dispute begins, lasting for 151 days.
 February 19 – Jean Lee becomes the last woman hanged in Australia, when she and her 2 pimps are hanged for the murder and torture of a 73-year-old bookmaker.
 February 25 – The first Pan American Games open in Buenos Aires.
 February 27 – The Twenty-second Amendment to the United States Constitution, limiting Presidents to two terms, is ratified.

March

 March 2 – The first NBA All-Star Game of basketball is played in the Boston Garden.
 March 3 or 5 – Jackie Brenston "and His Delta Cats" (actually Ike Turner's Kings of Rhythm) record "Rocket 88" at Sam Phillips' Sun Studio in Memphis, Tennessee, a candidate for the first rock and roll record (released in April). It is covered on June 14 by Bill Haley and His Saddlemen.
 March 6 – The trial of Julius and Ethel Rosenberg for conspiracy to commit espionage begins in the United States.
 March 9 – United Artists releases the sci-fi film The Man from Planet X in the United States.
 March 12 – Hank Ketcham's comic strip Dennis the Menace in the U.S. and Davey Law's Dennis the Menace in the U.K. appear for the first time.
 March 14
 Korean War: Operation Ripper – For the second time, United Nations troops recapture Seoul.
 West Germany joins UNESCO.
 March 29
 Second Red Scare: Julius and Ethel Rosenberg are convicted of conspiracy to commit espionage. On April 5 they are sentenced to death.
 Rodgers and Hammerstein's The King and I opens on Broadway, and runs for three years. It is the first of their musicals specifically written for an actress (Gertrude Lawrence). Lawrence is stricken with cancer during the run of the show, and dies halfway through its run a year later. The show makes a star of Yul Brynner.
 The 23rd Academy Awards Ceremony is held; All About Eve wins the Best Picture award and five others.
 March 31 – Remington Rand delivers the first UNIVAC I computer to the United States Census Bureau.

April
 April 11
 U.S. President Harry S. Truman relieves General Douglas MacArthur of his Far Eastern commands.
 After its clandestine removal from Westminster Abbey on Christmas Day, 1950, the Stone of Scone resurfaces at Arbroath Abbey in Scotland.
 April 18 – The Treaty of Paris (1951) is adopted, establishing the European Coal and Steel Community.
 April 21 – The National Olympic Committee of the Soviet Union is formed. The USSR will first participate in the Olympic Games at Helsinki, Finland, in 1952.
 April 24 – Sakuragichō train fire: in Yokohama, Japan, a fire on a train kills more than 100.
 April 27 – RKO releases the Howard Hawks sci-fi film The Thing from Another World.
 April 28 – 1951 Australian federal election: Robert Menzies' Liberal/Country Coalition Government is re-elected with a decreased majority, defeating the Labor Party, led by former Prime Minister Ben Chifley. Chifley dies a little over a month after the election; he will be replaced by his deputy H. V. Evatt.

May
 May 1 – The opera house of Geneva, Switzerland is almost destroyed in a fire.
 May 3
 King George VI opens the Festival of Britain in London, including the Royal Festival Hall.
 The U.S. Senate Committee on Armed Services and U.S. Senate Committee on Foreign Relations begin their closed door hearings into the dismissal of General Douglas MacArthur by U.S. President Harry S Truman.
 May 8 – Operation Greenhouse: The first thermonuclear weapon is tested in the "George" test on Enewetok Atoll in the Marshall Islands by the United States.
 May 14 – The first volunteer-run passenger trains run on the Talyllyn Railway in Wales.
 May 15 – A military coup occurs in Bolivia.
 May 21 – The 9th Street Art Exhibition, otherwise known as the Ninth Street Show, a gathering of a number of notable artists, marks the stepping-out of the postwar New York avant-garde, collectively known as the New York School.
 May 23 – The Tibetan government signs the Seventeen Point Agreement for the Peaceful Liberation of Tibet with the People's Republic of China.
 May 24 – Operation Greenhouse: The first atomic bomb "boosted" by the inclusion of tritium is tested in the "Item" test on Enewetok Atoll in the Marshall Islands by the United States.
 May 25–26 – British spies Guy Burgess and Donald Maclean leave the United Kingdom to defect to the Soviet Union.
 May 28 – The Goon Show is first broadcast on BBC Home Service in the U.K.; the first series is entitled "Crazy People".

June
 June 4 – The Foley Square trial concludes review in the U.S. Supreme Court as Dennis v. United States, with a ruling against the defendants (overturned by Yates v. United States in 1957).
 June 7 - Nazi war criminal Otto Ohlendorf is hung at Landsberg Prison, Bavaria.
 June 14 – UNIVAC I is dedicated by the U.S. Census Bureau.
 June 15–July 1 – In New Mexico, Arizona, California, Oregon, Washington and British Columbia, thousands of acres of forests are destroyed in fires.

July
 July 1
 Colombo Plan operations commence.
 Judy Garland opens the first of 14 concerts in Dublin, Ireland at the Theatre Royal.
 July 5 – William Shockley, John Bardeen and Walter Brattain, of Bell Labs, announce the invention of the grown-junction transistor. Same year, General Electric and RCA develop alloy-junction transistor.
 July 10
 Korean War: Armistice negotiations begin at Kaesong.
 A formal peace agreement between Canada and Germany is signed.
 July 13
 The Great Flood of 1951 reaches its highest point in northeast Kansas, culminating in the greatest flood damage to date in the Midwestern United States.
 MGM's Technicolor film version of Show Boat, starring Kathryn Grayson, Ava Gardner and Howard Keel, premieres at Radio City Music Hall in New York City. The musical brings overnight fame to bass-baritone William Warfield (who sings "Ol' Man River" in the film).
 July 14 – In Diamond, Missouri, the George Washington Carver National Monument becomes the first United States National Monument to honor an African American.
 July 16 – King Leopold III of Belgium abdicates in favour of his son Baudouin, who on July 17 takes the oath as king of Belgium.
 July 20 – King Abdullah I of Jordan is assassinated by a Palestinian while attending Friday prayers in Jerusalem. He is succeeded by his son, King Talal.
 July 26
 Walt Disney's 13th animated film, Alice in Wonderland, premieres in London, United Kingdom.
 The first birch bark manuscript is discovered in Novgorod.
 July 28 – Convention Relating to the Status of Refugees, a multilateral treaty of the United Nations, is signed at a special conference in Geneva, defining the status of refugees and setting out the basis for granting right of asylum, coming into force on 22 April 1954.
 July 30 – David Lean's film of Oliver Twist is finally shown in the United States, after 10 minutes of supposedly anti-Semitic references and closeups of Alec Guinness as Fagin are cut. It will not be shown uncut in the U.S. until 1970.

August
 August 11 – René Pleven becomes Prime Minister of France.
 August 12 – J. D. Salinger's coming-of-age story The Catcher in the Rye is first published in the United States.
 August 31 – The first Volkswagen Type 1 rolls off the production line in Uitenhage, South Africa.

September
 September 1 – The United States, Australia and New Zealand all sign a mutual defense pact, the ANZUS Treaty.
 September 2 – The Sri Lanka Freedom Party is founded by S. W. R. D. Bandaranaike.
 September 8
 Treaty of San Francisco: In San Francisco, 48 representatives out of 51 attending sign a peace treaty with Japan, formally ending the Pacific War; the delegations of the Soviet Union, Poland and Czechoslovakia do not sign the treaty, instead favoring separate treaties.
 The U.S.-Japan Security Treaty, which allows United States Armed Forces to be stationed in Japan even after the end of the occupation of Japan, is signed by Japan and the United States.
 September 9 – Chinese Communist forces move into Lhasa, the capital of Tibet.
 September 10 – The United Kingdom begins an economic boycott of Iran.
 September 18 – The following films are released in the United States:
 20th Century Fox's Robert Wise science fiction film The Day the Earth Stood Still.
 Elia Kazan's adaptation of the Tennessee Williams play A Streetcar Named Desire, becoming a critical and box-office smash.
 September 20 – NATO accepts Greece and Turkey as members.
 September 24 – MGM releases the musical Show Boat.
 September 26–28 – A blue sun is seen over Europe: the effect is due to ash coming from the Canadian forest fires 4 months previously.
 September 30 – Charlotte Whitton becomes mayor of Ottawa and Canada's first woman mayor of a major city.

October
 October 3 – "Shot Heard 'Round the World (baseball)": One of the greatest moments in Major League Baseball history occurs when the New York Giants' Bobby Thomson hits a game-winning home run in the bottom of the 9th inning off of Brooklyn Dodgers pitcher Ralph Branca, to win the National League pennant after being down 14 games.
 October 3–8 – Korean War: First Battle of Maryang-san – United Nations (primarily Australian) forces drive back the Chinese.
 October 4
 MGM's Technicolor musical film An American in Paris, starring Gene Kelly and Leslie Caron, and directed by Vincente Minnelli, premieres in New York. It will go on to win 6 Academy Awards, including Best Picture.
 Shoppers World, one of the first shopping malls in the United States, opens in Framingham, Massachusetts.
 October 6 – Malayan Emergency: Communist insurgents kill British commander Sir Henry Gurney.
 October 14 – The Organization of Central American States (Organización de Estados Centroamericanos, ODECA) is formed.
 October 15
 Norethisterone, the progestin used in the combined oral contraceptive pill, is synthesized by Luis E. Miramontes in Mexico.
 I Love Lucy makes its debut on CBS television in the United States.
 October 16
 Judy Garland begins a series of concerts in New York's Palace Theatre.
 Prime Minister Liaquat Ali Khan of Pakistan is assassinated.
 East China Normal University is founded in Shanghai, China.
 October 17 – CBS's Eye logo premieres on American television.
 October 19 – The state of war between the United States and Germany is officially ended.
 October 20 – The Johnny Bright incident occurs in Stillwater, Oklahoma.
 October 21 – A storm in southern Italy kills over 100.
 October 24 – U.S. President Harry Truman declares an official end to war with Germany.
 October 26 – Winston Churchill is re-elected Prime Minister of the United Kingdom (a month before his 77th birthday) in a general election which sees the defeat of Clement Attlee's Labour government, after 6 years in power.
 October 27 – Farouk of Egypt declares himself king of Sudan, with no support.
 October 29 – The town of Carnation, Washington, USA changes its name back to Carnation, after being named Tolt since May 1928.
 October 31 – The film Scrooge, starring Alastair Sim, opens in England.

November
 November 1 – Desert Rock exercises, the first military exercises for nuclear war, with infantry troops included, are held in the Nevada desert.
 November 2 – 6,000 British troops are flown into Egypt to quell unrest in the Suez Canal zone.
 November 10 – Direct dial coast-to-coast telephone service begins in the United States.
 November 11
 Juan Perón is re-elected president of Argentina.
 Monogram Pictures releases the sci-fi film Flight to Mars in the United States.
 November 12 – The National Ballet of Canada performs for the first time in Eaton Auditorium, Toronto.
 November 20 – The Po River floods in northern Italy.
 November 22 – Paramount Pictures releases the George Pal science fiction film When Worlds Collide in the United States.
 November 24 – The Broadway play Gigi opens, starring Audrey Hepburn as the lead character.
 November 28 – The U.K. film Scrooge, starring Alastair Sim, premieres in the United States under the title of Charles Dickens's original novel, A Christmas Carol.
 November 29 – LEO runs the world's first commercial computer program, bakery valuations, for J. Lyons and Co.'s tea shops in the U.K.

December
 c. December – The Institute of War and Peace Studies is established by Dwight D. Eisenhower at Columbia University in New York (of which he is President) with William T. R. Fox as first director.
 December 3 – Lebanese University is founded in Lebanon.
 December 5 – The Provisional Intergovernmental Committee for the Movement of Migrants from Europe is formed.
 December 6 – A state of emergency is declared in Egypt, due to increasing riots.
 December 13 – A water storage tank collapses in Tucumcari, New Mexico, resulting in 4 deaths and 200 buildings destroyed.
 December 14 – Raj Kapoor's first blockbuster movie, Awaara is released in India.
 December 16 – Police series Dragnet first airs in its television version in the United States.
 December 17 – We Charge Genocide, a petition describing genocide against African Americans, is delivered to the United Nations.
 December 20
 Experimental Breeder Reactor I (EBR-1), the world's first (experimental) nuclear power plant, opens in Idaho.
 A chartered Curtiss C-46 Commando crash-lands in Cobourg, Ontario Canada; all on board survive.
 The World Meteorological Organization becomes a specialized agency of the United Nations.
 December 22 – The Selangor Labour Party is founded in Selangor, Malaya.
 December 23 – John Huston's drama film The African Queen, starring Humphrey Bogart and Katharine Hepburn, premieres in Hollywood.
 December 24
 Libya becomes independent from Italy; Idris I is proclaimed King.
 Gian Carlo Menotti's 45-minute opera, Amahl and the Night Visitors, premieres live on NBC in the United States, becoming the first opera written especially for television.
 December 31 – The Marshall Plan expires, after distributing more than $13.3 billion US in foreign aid to rebuild Europe.

Unknown dates
 A fourth and final forest fire starts in the Tillamook Burn, Oregon; but unlike earlier fires this one burns only , and within an area already affected by the earlier fires.
 A research team publishes the Interlingua–English Dictionary.
 IBM (United Kingdom) is formed.
 In Munich, Germany, a collection of mementos and personal papers belonging to Adolf Hitler are turned over to Bayerische Landesbank, for authentication and eventual sale.  Among the documents are his appointment as Chancellor signed by President Paul von Hindenburg, his Austrian passport, as well as an assortment of swastika insignia pins and medals. An initial offer of $200,000.00 is made for the collection.
 An 18-year-old sailor is fined for kissing in public in Stockholm, Sweden. The law court calls his actions "obnoxious behavior repulsive to the public morals".
 The United States becomes malaria-free (excluding territories and possessions)

Births

January

 January 1 
 Dante Garro, Argentine football player and manager (d. 2008)
 Ashfaq Hussain, Urdu poet
 Nana Patekar, Indian actor, writer, philanthropist and filmmaker
 January 2
 Jan Fischer, 8th Prime Minister of the Czech Republic
 Vincenzo Zazzaro, Italian footballer (d. 2019)
 January 3 – Charles W. Mills, British-born American philosopher (d. 2021)
 January 5 – Steve Arnold, English footballer
 January 6 – Kim Wilson, American singer, harmonica player
 January 8
 Kenny Anthony, Lucian politician, 2-time Prime Minister of Saint Lucia
 John McTiernan, American director, producer and writer
January 10 – Tim Seelig, American composer
 January 12
 Chris Bell, American guitarist, singer and songwriter (d. 1978)
 Rush Limbaugh, American conservative radio personality (d. 2021)
 January 18 – Elijah Cummings, African-American politician (d. 2019)
 January 20 – Rouslan Saghabalyan, Russian writer, journalist and screenwriter
 January 22
 Alveda King, American activist, minister, author and politician
 Ondrej Nepela, Czechoslovak figure skater (d. 1989)
 January 23 – Sully Sullenberger, American airline captain
 January 25 – Steve Prefontaine, American runner (d. 1975)
 January 30
 Phil Collins, English rock musician and producer Charles S. Dutton, African-American actor
 January 31
 Dave Benton, Aruban-born American singer
 Harry Wayne Casey, American musician, songwriter and producer
 Phil Manzanera, British rock musician

February

 February 1 – Albert Salvadó, Andorran writer (d. 2020)
 February 3
 Blaise Compaoré, 3rd President of Burkina Faso (1987-2014)
 Felipe Muñoz, Mexican swimmer
 Eugenijus Riabovas, Lithuanian football manager
 February 5
 O'Neal Compton, American actor and director (d. 2019)
 Ryūsei Nakao, Japanese actor, singer and voice actor
 February 10 – Bob Iger, American CEO of The Walt Disney Company
 February 12 – Rossana Ordóñez, Venezuelan journalist (d. 2021)
February 14 – Kevin Keegan, English footballer and manager
 February 15
 Melissa Manchester, American pop singer
 Jane Seymour, English actress
 February 16 – William Katt, American film, television actor (The Greatest American Hero)
 February 19 – Muhammad Tahir-ul-Qadri, Pakistani Islamic Sufi scholar, leader
February 20
Gordon Brown, Scottish-born Prime Minister of the United Kingdom
Edward Albert, American film and television actor (d. 2006)
February 22 – Ellen Greene, American actress
February 23 – Patricia Richardson, American actress
February 24 – Debra Jo Rupp, American actress (That 70's Show)
February 25 – Don Quarrie, Jamaican sprinter
February 27
Lee Atwater, American political activist, campaign strategist and presidential advisor (d. 1991)
Steve Harley, British rock musician

March

 March 1
 Sergei Kourdakov, Soviet KGB agent, later Christian convert (d. 1973)
 Mike Read, British television presenter, radio disc jockey
 March 3
Botak Chin, Malaysian criminal and gangster (d. 1981)
Heizō Takenaka, Japanese economist
 March 4
 Edelgard Bulmahn, German politician
 Kenny Dalglish, Scottish footballer and manager
 Mike Quarry, American light-heavyweight boxer (d. 2006)
 Chris Rea, British singer, musician
 Gwen Welles, American actress (d. 1993)
 Linda Yamamoto, Japanese pop star
 March 6 – Gerrie Knetemann, Dutch cyclist (d. 2004)
 March 8 – Karen Kain, Canadian ballerina
 March 9 – Zakir Hussian, Indian tabla virtuoso, composer, percussionist, music producer and actor
 March 10 – Gloria Diaz, Filipino actress of film and television, model and beauty queen
 March 12 – Susan Musgrave, Canadian poet, children's writer
 March 13 – Charo, Spanish-American singer, entertainer
 March 14 – Jerry Greenfield, American co-founder of Ben & Jerry's ice cream
 March 17 – Kurt Russell, American actor 
 March 18
 Ben Cohen, American co-founder of Ben & Jerry's ice cream
 B. E. Taylor, American singer (d. 2016)
 March 19 – Fred Berry, American actor (d. 2003)
 March 20 – Jimmie Vaughan, American blues rock guitarist and singer 
 March 24 – Tommy Hilfiger, American fashion designer
 March 26
 Aleksey Buldakov, Russian actor (d. 2019)
 Carl Wieman, American physicist, Nobel Prize laureate
 March 30 – Wolfgang Niedecken, German singer

April

 April 1 – Tim Bassett, American basketball player (d. 2018)
 April 5
 Joe Bowen, Canadian hockey broadcaster
 Dean Kamen, American inventor, entrepreneur
 Frank Moulaert, Flemish scholar
 Guy Vanderhaeghe, Canadian author
 April 6
 Bert Blyleven, Dutch Major League Baseball player
 Rita Raave, Estonian actress
 April 7 – Janis Ian, American singer-songwriter 
 April 8
 Geir Haarde, Prime Minister of Iceland (2006–2009)
 Joan Sebastian, Mexican singer, songwriter (d. 2015)
 April 11
 Doris Angleton, American socialite, murder victim (d. 1997)
 Rohini Hattangadi, Indian actress
 April 12 – Tom Noonan, American actor
 April 13
 Peabo Bryson, African-American singer
 Peter Davison, British actor
 Max Weinberg, American drummer
 John Furey, American actor
 April 14
 Julian Lloyd Webber, English cellist
 Greg Winter, English biochemist, Nobel Prize laureate
 April 15 – Trixi Schuba, Austrian figure skater
 April 16
 Celso Daniel, Brazilian politician (d. 2002)
 Mordechai Ben David, American singer
 Ioan Mihai Cochinescu, Romanian writer
 Björgvin Halldórsson, Icelandic singer
 Pierre Toutain-Dorbec, French photographer
 April 17
 Horst Hrubesch, German footballer
 Olivia Hussey, Argentine-born actress (Romeo and Juliet)
 April 19 – Jóannes Eidesgaard, Prime Minister of the Faroe Islands
 April 20
 Louise Jameson, British actress
 Luther Vandross, African-American R&B, soul singer, songwriter (d. 2005)
 April 21
 Tony Danza, American actor and comedian (Who's the Boss?)
 Vladimír Špidla, 4th Prime Minister of the Czech Republic
 April 22 – Paul Carrack, English singer 
 April 23 – Allison Krause, American Kent State University shooting victim (d. 1970)
 April 24 – Enda Kenny, 13th Taoiseach of Ireland
 April 27
 Ace Frehley, American rock guitarist (Kiss)
 Freundel Stuart, 7th Prime Minister of Barbados
 April 29
 Kwesi Amissah-Arthur, Ghanaian economist, academic and politician (d. 2018)
 Dale Earnhardt, American race car driver (d. 2001)

May

 May 3 – Christopher Cross, American singer-songwriter  
 May 6
 Antonio Saldías, Chilean historian
 Samuel Doe, President of Liberia (d. 1990)
 May 8 – Philip Bailey, American singer of R&B, soul, gospel and funk. He is also one of the vocalists of the band Earth, Wind & Fire.
 May 9
 Christopher Dewdney, Canadian poet
 Joy Harjo, Native American poet
 May 13
 Selina Scott, English journalist, television presenter
 Jumbo Tsuruta, Japanese professional wrestler (d. 2000)
 May 15
 Yoshifumi Hibako, Japanese general
 Jonathan Richman, American musician
 Frank Wilczek, American physicist, Nobel Prize laureate
 Paolo Torrisi, Italian actor and voice actor (d. 2005)
 May 16 – Unshō Ishizuka, Japanese voice actor (d. 2018)
 May 18 – Ben Feringa, Dutch organic chemist, Nobel Prize laureate
 May 19
 Joey Ramone, American rock musician (Ramones) (d. 2001)
 Dick Slater, American professional wrestler (d. 2018)
 May 20 – Christie Blatchford, Canadian newspaper columnist, journalist and broadcaster (d. 2020)
 May 23
 Jill E. Barad, American businessperson
 Anatoly Karpov, Russian chess player
 Antonis Samaras, Greek economist, politician and 185th Prime Minister of Greece
 May 25 – Jamaluddin Jarjis, Malaysian politician (d. 2015)
 May 26
 Ramón Calderón, Spanish lawyer and businessman
 Lou van den Dries, Dutch mathematician
 Sally Ride, American astronaut (d. 2012)
 Madeleine Taylor-Quinn, Irish politician
 May 30
 Stephen Tobolowsky, American actor
 Fernando Lugo, President of Paraguay
 May 31 – Jimmy Nalls, American guitarist (Sea Level) (d. 2017)

June

 June 2 
Gilbert Baker, American artist and activist (d. 2017)
Jeanine Pirro, Lebanese-American attorney, politician and conservative political commentator
Larry Robinson, Canadian hockey player
 June 3 – Jill Biden, First Lady of the United States
 June 5 – Suze Orman, American financial advisor, writer and television personality
 June 8 – Bonnie Tyler, Welsh pop singer
 June 9 – James Newton Howard, American musician, composer
 June 12
 Brad Delp, American rock vocalist (d. 2007)
 Andranik Margaryan, 14th Prime Minister of Armenia (d. 2007)
 June 13
 Stellan Skarsgård, Swedish actor
 Richard Thomas, American actor
 June 14 – Paul Boateng, British politician
 June 15
 Jane Amsterdam, American magazine editor
 Álvaro Colom, 35th President of Guatemala (d. 2023)
 June 16
 Charlie Dominici, American musician
 Roberto Durán, Panamanian boxer
 June 17 – Shahidan Kassim, Malaysian politician
 June 18
 Gyula Sax, Hungarian chess grandmaster (d. 2014)
 Steve Miner, American film, television director, film producer
 June 19 – Ayman al-Zawahiri, Egyptian-born terrorist (d. 2022)
 June 20
 Tress MacNeille, American voice actress
 Paul Muldoon, Irish-born poet
 June 21
 Nils Lofgren, American musician
 Marcus Mojigoh, Malaysian politician
 June 23 – Michèle Mouton, French rally driver
 June 24
 Leslie Cochran, American homeless activist (d. 2012)
 David Rodigan, British radio DJ/actor
 June 25 - Elvy Sukaesih, Indonesian dangdut singer
 June 27
 Ulf Andersson, Swedish chess player
 Madan Bhandari, Nepalese politician (d. 1993)
 Julia Duffy, American actress
 Mary McAleese, 8th President of Ireland
 June 28
 Mick Cronin, Australian rugby league player
 Lloyd Maines, American musician, record producer
 Daniel Ruiz, Spanish footballer
 Lalla Ward, British actress
 June 29
 Zvi Eliezer Alonie, Israeli rabbi
 Keno Don Rosa, American comic book author
 Billy Hinsche, Philippine-born American musician (d. 2021)
 Craig Sager, American sports commentator (d. 2016)
 June 30 – Stanley Clarke, American bassist

July

 July 1
 Sabah Abdul-Jalil, Iraqi footballer and coach (d. 2021)
 Abdul Karim Jassim, Iraqi footballer and coach
 Abdoulkader Kamil Mohamed, Djiboutian politician
 Thomas Boni Yayi, 7th President of Benin
 July 2
 Elisabeth Brooks, Canadian actress (d. 1997)
 Wiesław Gawlikowski, Polish sport shooter
 Guido Magherini, Italian footballer and coach
 Stevie Woods, American singer (d. 2014)
 July 3
 Richard Hadlee, New Zealand cricketer
 Lodewijk Jacobs, Dutch sprint canoer
 Bob Rigby, U.S. soccer goalkeeper
 July 4
 Beverly Boys, Canadian diver
 S. S. Ahluwalia, Indian politician
 July 5
 Goose Gossage, American baseball player
 Yehoshua Gal, Israeli footballer
 Gilbert Van Binst, Belgian footballer
 July 6 – Geoffrey Rush, Australian actor
 July 7 – Menachem Ben-Sasson, Israeli politician
 July 8 – Anjelica Huston, American actress
 July 9
 Jeje Odongo, Ugandan military officer and politician
 Chris Cooper, American actor
 July 10 – Phyllis Smith, American actress
 July 11 – Yechiel Eckstein, Israeli-American rabbi (d. 2019)
 July 12 – Cheryl Ladd, American actress and singer
 July 14 – Erich Hallhuber, German actor (d. 2003)
 July 15
 Folorunso Alakija, Nigerian businesswoman
 Rick Kehoe, Canadian professional ice hockey player and coach
  Jesse Ventura wrestler, navy seal, actor, and former mayor and governor
 July 16
 Jean-Luc Mongrain, Canadian news anchor and journalist
 Che Rosli, Malaysian politician
 Franco Serantini, Italian anarchist (d. 1972)
 July 18
 Eva Wittke, German swimmer
 Elio Di Rupo, Belgian politician
 July 21 – Robin Williams, American actor and comedian (d. 2014)
 July 22 – William Nyallau Badak, Malaysian politician
 July 23 – Edie McClurg, American actress
 July 24
 Fiona Reid, English-born Canadian actress
 Lynda Carter, American actress and singer
 Chris Smith, British politician
 July 25 – Yury Kovalchuk, Russian oligarch
 July 26 – Sabine Leutheusser-Schnarrenberger, German politician
 July 28
 Alfredo Pérez Rubalcaba, Spanish politician (d. 2019)
 Santiago Calatrava, Spanish architect and engineer
 July 31
 Evonne Goolagong Cawley, Australian tennis player
 Vjekoslav Šutej, Croatian orchestral conductor (d. 2009)

August

 August 2 
 Andrew Gold, American singer-songwriter and musician (10cc, Wax) (d. 2011)
 Burgess Owens, American politician
 August 3 – Marcel Dionne, Canadian hockey player
 August 6
 Catherine Hicks, American actress
 Daryl Somers, Australian television personality
 August 8
 Louis van Gaal, Dutch footballer and manager
 Mohamed Morsi, Egyptian politician, 5th President of Egypt (d. 2019)
 Mamoru Oshii, Japanese film director
 Randy Shilts, American journalist and author (d. 1994)
 August 10 – Juan Manuel Santos, President of Colombia and recipient of the Nobel Peace Prize
 August 11 – Katsumi Chō, Japanese voice actor
 August 13 – Dan Fogelberg, American singer, songwriter and multi-instrumentalist (d. 2007)
 August 15 – Jim Allen, West Indian cricketer
 August 16 – Umaru Musa Yar'Adua, 13th President of Nigeria (d. 2010)
 August 17 – Richard Hunt, American puppeteer (d. 1992)
 August 19 – John Deacon, English rock bassist
 August 20 – Greg Bear, American author (d. 2022)
 August 21
 Eric Goles, Chilean mathematician and computer scientist
 Chesley V. Morton, American politician and securities arbitrator
 Harry Smith, American journalist and editor
 August 22 – Chandra Prakash Mainali, Nepalese politician
 August 23
 Jimi Jamison, American musician (Survivor) (d. 2014)
 Akhmad Kadyrov, President of Chechnya (d. 2004)
 Queen Noor of Jordan, born Lisa Najeeb Halaby, American-born queen consort
 August 24 – Orson Scott Card, American writer
 August 25 – Rob Halford, English rock singer
 August 26 – Edward Witten, American mathematician, Fields medalist
 August 28 – Wayne Osmond, American pop singer
 August 30
 Behgjet Pacolli, 3rd President of Kosovo.
 Dana Rosemary Scallon, Irish singer, Eurovision Song Contest 1970 winner and Member of the European Parliament (MEP)
 August 31 – Peter Withe, English footballer

September

 September 2
 Jim DeMint, American politician, United States Senator (R-SC)
 Mark Harmon, American actor
 September 4 – Judith Ivey, American actress
 September 5 – Michael Keaton, American actor
 September 6 – Šaban Šaulić, Serbian musician (d. 2019)
 September 7
 Chrissie Hynde, American rock singer
 Mammootty, Indian actor and producer
 September 9 – Alexander Downer, Australian politician, diplomat
 September 12
 Bertie Ahern, Taoiseach of Ireland
 Joe Pantoliano, American actor
 September 13
 Jean Smart, American actress 
 Salva Kiir Mayardit, 1st President of South Sudan
 September 14
 Duncan Haldane, English-born condensed-matter physicist, recipient of the Nobel Prize in Physics
 Volodymyr Melnykov, Ukrainian poet, writer, songwriter and composer 
 September 15
 Pete Carroll, American football coach
 Jared Taylor, American author and journalist
 Fred Seibert, American producer and Frederator Studios founder
 September 17 – Cassandra Peterson, American actress, known for her role in Elvira, Mistress of the Dark September 18
 Ben Carson, African-American politician, author and neurosurgeon
 Dee Dee Ramone, American bassist (d. 2002)
 September 20 
 Guy Lafleur, Canadian hockey player (d. 2022)
 Javier Marías, Spanish novelist (d. 2022)
 September 21 – Aslan Maskhadov, President of Chechnya (d. 2005)
 September 22
 David Coverdale, English singer and musician
 Wolfgang Petry, German singer
 September 24 – Alfonso Portillo, President of Guatemala
 September 25
 Mark Hamill, American actor, better known for his role in Star Wars Bob McAdoo, American basketball player and coach
 September 26 – Stuart Tosh, Scottish musician
 September 28 – Jim Diamond, Scottish singer-songwriter (d. 2015)
 September 29
 Michelle Bachelet, President of Chile
 Andrés Caicedo, Colombian writer (d. 1977)
 Maureen Caird, Australian hurdler
 Mike Enriquez, Filipino radio and television newscaster
 September 30 – Barry Marshall, Australian physician and recipient of the Nobel Prize in Physiology or Medicine

October

 October 2 – Sting, British singer, rock musician, philanthropist
 October 3
 Keb' Mo', American musician
 Kathryn D. Sullivan, American astronaut
 October 4 – Bakhytzhan Kanapyanov, Kazakh poet
 October 5 – 
Bob Geldof, Irish musician (The Boomtown Rats)
Karen Allen, American actress
 October 6 – Manfred Winkelhock, German racing driver (d. 1985)
 October 7
 Jakaya Kikwete, 4th President of Tanzania
 John Mellencamp, American musician and songwriter
 October 10 – Epeli Ganilau, Fijian soldier and statesman
 October 11
 Jean-Jacques Goldman, French singer and songwriter
 Jon Miller, American sports announcer
 October 15
 Hani Al-Mulki, Prime Minister of Jordan
 Rafael Vaganian, Armenian chess grandmaster
 October 17 – Prabowo Subianto, Indonesian businessman, politician and Lieutenant General of the Indonesian National Armed Forces
 October 18
 Pam Dawber, American actress
 Mike Antonovich, American ice hockey player and executive
 Terry McMillan, American author
 October 19 – Annie Golden, Americana actress
 October 20 – Claudio Ranieri, Italian football manager and player
 October 22 – William David Sanders, American victim of the Columbine High School massacre (d. 1999)
 October 23 – Charly García, Argentine musician and songwriter
 October 25 – Richard Lloyd, American rock guitarist
 October 26
 Willie P. Bennett, Canadian songwriter and singer (d. 2008)
 Bootsy Collins, American musician, singer-songwriter
 October 27 – Éric Morena, French singer (d. 2019)
 October 28 - Marvin Heemeyer, American man who went on a rampage with an armored bulldozer in Granby, Colorado (d. 2004)
 October 29 - Kelly Sutherland, Canadian Pro Chuckwagon racer
 October 30 – Harry Hamlin, American actor
 October 31 – Nick Saban, American football coach

November

 November 2 – Thomas Mallon, American author and critic
 November 3 – Ed Murawinski, American cartoonist (New York Daily News)
 November 4 – Traian Băsescu, President of Romania
 November 7 – Dennis Allen, Australian criminal and drug dealer, eldest son of Kath Pettingill (d. 1987)
 November 8 – Alfredo Astiz, Argentine commander
 November 9
 Martin Khor, Malaysian journalist and economist (d. 2020)
 Lou Ferrigno, American actor and bodybuilder
 November 10 – Danilo Medina, Dominican politician 53rd President of the Dominican Republic
 November 11 – Bill Moseley, American Actor
 November 12 – Marcelo Rezende, Brazilian journalist and television presenter (d. 2017)
 November 14 – Alec John Such, American musician (Bon Jovi member) (d. 2022)
 November 15
 Alamgir Hashmi, English poet
 Beverly D'Angelo, American actress and singer
 November 16
 Miguel Sandoval, American actor
 Sulaiman Taha, Malaysian politician (d. 2010)
 Paula Vogel, American playwright
 November 17
 Butch Davis, American NFL and NCAA football head coach
 Dean Paul Martin, American pop singer and screen actor (d. 1987)
 Stephen Root, American actor and voice actor
 November 18 – Justin Raimondo, American political activist (d. 2019)
 November 19
 Zeenat Aman, Indian actress and model
 Charlie Falconer, Baron Falconer of Thoroton, British politician
 November 20 – Rodger Bumpass, American voice actor known for his role as Squidward Tentacles on SpongeBob SquarePants''
 November 21 – Thomas Roth, German television news anchor and presenter
 November 24 – Chet Edwards, American politician
 November 26 – Cicciolina, Hungarian-Italian actress and politician
 November 27 – Teri DeSario, American singer-songwriter
 November 29
 Kathryn Bigelow, American film director
 Roger Troutman, American funk musician (d. 1999)
 November 30 – Christian Bernard, French-born mystic

December

 December 1
 Sherry Aldridge, American singer
 Obba Babatundé, American actor
 Jaco Pastorius, American bassist (d. 1987)
 Treat Williams, American actor, writer and aviator 
 December 2 – Adrian Devine, American baseball pitcher (d. 2020)
 December 3
 Natalis Chan, Hong Kong actor and producer
 Riki Choshu, Korean-Japanese professional wrestler
 December 4
 Chang Fei, Taiwanese television personality
 Patricia Wettig, American actress
 December 6 – Tomson Highway, Canadian writer
 December 8
 Bill Bryson, American-born British non-fiction author
 Jan Eggum, Norwegian singer and songwriter
 December 11 – Peter T. Daniels, American writing systems scholar
 December 12
 Wau Holland, German hacker (d. 2001)
 Fyodor Konyukhov, Ukrainian explorer and priest
 December 14
 Mike Krüger, German comedian and singer
 Jan Timman, Dutch chess player
 December 17 – Ken Hitchcock, Canadian hockey coach
 December 18 – Alvin E. Roth, American academic
 December 20 – Peter May, Scottish novelist and television dramatist
 December 21 – Fiorella Bonicelli, Uruguayan tennis player
 December 27 
 Levy Fidelix, Brazilian politician, businessman, and journalist (d. 2021)
 Ernesto Zedillo, 54th President of Mexico (1994-2000)
 December 29 – Georges Thurston, Canadian singer (d. 2007)

Full date unknown
Peter Hargitay, public relations executive and a partner of the European Consultancy Network

Deaths

January

 January 3 – Georgios Drossinis, Greek author, poet, scholar and editor (b. 1859)
 January 5 – Yasunosuke Gonda, Japanese sociologist and theorist (b. 1887)
 January 6
 Ken Le Breton, Australian speedway rider (b. 1924)
 Maila Talvio, Finnish writer, nominated for the Nobel Prize in Literature (b. 1871)
 January 7
 René Guénon, French metaphysician (b. 1886)
 Lucien Cuénot, French biologist (b. 1866)
 January 10 – Sinclair Lewis, American writer, Nobel Prize laureate (b. 1885)
 January 12
 Jacques de Baroncelli, French director and screenwriter (b. 1881)
 Albert Guay, Canadian murderer (executed) (b. 1917)
 Prince Maximilian of Saxony (b. 1870)
 January 13
 Dorothea Bate,  British palaeontologist, a pioneer of archaeozoology (b. 1878)
 Florence Kahn, American actress (b. 1878)
 Francesco Marchetti Selvaggiani, Italian Roman Catholic cardinal and eminence (b. 1871)
 January 15 – Sir Ernest Swinton, British Army general (b. 1868)
 January 16 – Tsunejirō Ishii, Japanese admiral (b. 1887)
 January 17 – Franziskus Hennemann, South African Titular bishop and reverend (b. 1882)
 January 18
 Amy Carmichael, Irish missionary to India (b. 1867)
 Jack Holt, American actor (b. 1888)
 January 21 – Yuriko Miyamoto, Japanese novelist (b. 1899)
 January 22 – Harald Bohr, Danish mathematician and footballer (b. 1887)
 January 23 – Robert J. Blackham, British general and author (b. 1868)
 January 27 – Carl Gustaf Emil Mannerheim, Finnish military leader and statesman, 6th President of Finland (b. 1867)
 January 28
 Dominic Salvatore Gentile, American pilot (b. 1920)
 Petar Dujam Munzani, Italian Roman Catholic archbishop and reverend (b. 1890)
 January 29 – Frank Tarrant, Australian cricketer (b. 1880)
 January 30 – Ferdinand Porsche, German auto engineer (b. 1875)

February

 February 1 – Blas Taracena Aguirre, Spanish archaeologist (b. 1895)
 February 3
Choudhry Rahmat Ali, one of the founding fathers of Pakistan (b. 1895)
 Zaifeng, Prince Chun, Qing Dynasty prince (b. 1883)
 February 8
 Fritz Thyssen, German businessman and industrialist (b. 1873)
 Zygmunt Szendzielarz, Polish commander (b. 1910)
 February 9 – Eddy Duchin, American pianist and bandleader (b. 1909)
 February 13 – Lloyd C. Douglas, American author (b. 1877)
 February 14 – Andrés Barbero, Paraguayan scientist and botanist (b. 1877)
 February 18
 Lyman Gilmore, American aviation pioneer (b. 1874)
 Miloš Slovák, Czech painter (b. 1885)
 February 19 – André Gide, French writer, Nobel Prize laureate (b. 1869)
 February 22 – Alfred Lindley, American Olympic rower - Men's eights (b. 1904)
 February 28
 Henry W. Armstrong, American boxer and songwriter (b. 1879)
 Giannina Russ, Italian soprano (b. 1873)

March

 March 1 – Maria Dickin, British social reformer (b. 1870)
 March 2
 Cassiano Conzatti, Italian botanist, explorer and pteridologist (b. 1862)
 Al Taylor, American actor (b. 1887)
 March 4
 Anna Berentine Anthoni, Norwegian trade unionist and politician (b. 1884)
 Zoltán Meszlényi, Hungarian Roman Catholic priest, bishop, martyr and blessed (b. 1892)
 March 6
 Ivor Novello, British actor, musician and composer (b. 1893)
 Volodymyr Vynnychenko, Ukrainian statesman, political activist, writer, playwright and artist, 1st Prime Minister of Ukraine (b. 1880)
 March 7 – Prince Rangsit Prayurasakdi (b. 1885)
 March 8 – Charles Coleman, American actor (b. 1885)
 March 10 – Kijūrō Shidehara, Japanese diplomat, 31st Prime Minister of Japan (b. 1872)
 March 11 – János Zsupánek, Prekmurje Slovene poet and writer (b. 1861)
 March 12 – Alfred Hugenberg, German businessman and politician (b. 1865)
 March 13 – Ants "the Terrible" Kaljurand, Estonian anti-communist, freedom fighter and forest brother (b. 1917)
 March 14 – Val Lewton, American producer and screenwriter (b. 1904)
 March 16 – Janusz Jędrzejewicz, Polish politician and educator, 24th Prime Minister of Poland (b. 1885)
 March 17 – Archduke Karl Albrecht of Austria (b. 1888)
 March 19 – Dmytro Doroshenko, Soviet political figure (b. 1882)
 March 20 – Alfredo Baquerizo, 19th President of Ecuador (b. 1859)
 March 21 – Willem Mengelberg, Dutch conductor (b. 1871)
 March 24 – José Enrique Varela, Spanish military officer (b. 1871)
 March 25
 Eddie Collins, American baseball player (Chicago White Sox) and a member of the MLB Hall of Fame (b. 1887)
 Oscar Micheaux, American filmmaker (b. 1884)
 March 31 – Ralph Forbes, American actor (b. 1896)

April

 April 2 – Mikhail Vladimirsky, Soviet politician (b. 1874)
 April 4 – George Albert Smith, President of the Church of Jesus Christ of Latter-day Saints (b. 1870)
 April 5 – Cường Để, Vietnamese revolutionary leader (b. 1882)
 April 6 – Robert Broom, British paleontologist (b. 1866)
 April 9 – Vilhelm Bjerknes, Norwegian physicist and meteorologist (b. 1862) 
 April 11
 Peter Enzenauer, Canadian politician (b. 1878)
 Joe King, American actor (b. 1883)
 April 14 
 Ernest Bevin, British labour leader, politician and statesman (b. 1881)
 Al Christie, Canadian film director and producer (b. 1881)
 April 16 – Adolph Bolm,  Russian-American dancer and choreographer (b. 1881)
 April 18 – Óscar Carmona, 96th Prime Minister of Portugal and 11th President of Portugal (b. 1869)
 April 19 – Frank Hopkins, American professional horseman, soldier (b. 1865)
 April 20 – Ivanoe Bonomi, Italian politician and statesman, 25th Prime Minister of Italy (b. 1873)
 April 21 – Lambertus Johannes Toxopeus, Dutch lepidopterist (b. 1894)
 April 22 – Horace Donisthorpe, British myrmecologist (b. 1870)
 April 23 – Charles G. Dawes, 30th Vice President of the United States, recipient of the Nobel Peace Prize (b. 1865)
 April 25 – Shyam, Hindi actor (b. 1920)
 April 26 – Arnold Sommerfeld, German physicist (b. 1868)
 April 29 – Ludwig Wittgenstein, Austrian philosopher (b. 1889)

May

 May 1 – Klymentiy Sheptytsky, Soviet Orthodox priest, martyr and blessed (b. 1869)
 May 2
 Alphonse de Châteaubriant, French writer (b. 1877)
 Mansour bin Abdulaziz Al Saud, Saudi politician (b. 1921)
 May 3 – Homero Manzi, Argentine Tango lyricist and author (b. 1907)
 May 5
 Eddie Dunn, American actor (b. 1896)
 John Flynn, Australian medical services pioneer (b. 1880)
 Andronicus Rudenko, Greek Orthodox priest and blessed (b. 1874)
 May 6 – Henri Carton de Wiart, 23rd Prime Minister of Belgium (b. 1869)
 May 7 – Warner Baxter, American actor (b. 1889)
 May 8 – Pat Hartigan, American actor and director (b. 1881)
 May 10 – Nikola Mushanov, 23rd Prime Minister of Bulgaria (b. 1872)
 May 16 – François Hussenot, French engineer (b. 1912)
 May 17
 William Birdwood, 1st Baron Birdwood, British field marshal (b. 1865)
 Mary Emelia Moore, New Zealand Presbyterian missionary in China (b. 1869)
 Empress Teimei of Japan, Empress consort of Emperor Taishō (b. 1884)
 May 18 – Gaspar Agüero Barreras, Cuban composer, pianist and composer (b. 1873)
 May 20 – Marguerite Merington, English-American author (b. 1857)
 May 23 – Antonio Gandusio, Italian actor (b. 1875)
 May 25
 Franz Klebusch, German actor (b. 1887)
 Paula von Preradović, Austrian poet and writer (b. 1887)
 May 27 – Sir Thomas Blamey, Australian field marshal (b. 1884)
 May 29
 Fanny Brice, American entertainer (b. 1891)
 Antonio Mosca, Italian painter (b. 1870)
 May 30
 Hermann Broch, Austrian author (b. 1886)
 Sir Reginald Tyrwhitt, British admiral (b. 1870)

June

 June 1
 José Alejandrino, Filipino general (b. 1870)
 Rafael Altamira y Crevea, Spanish historian and jurist (b. 1866)
 Ludvig Oskar, Estonian painter (b. 1874)
 June 4 – Serge Koussevitzky, Russian-born conductor (b. 1874)
 June 7
 Paul Blobel, German SS officer (executed) (b. 1894)
 Werner Braune, German SS officer (executed) (b. 1909)
 Erich Naumann, German SS officer (executed) (b. 1905)
 Otto Ohlendorf, German SS officer (executed) (b. 1907)
 Oswald Pohl, German SS officer (executed) (b. 1892)
 June 9 – Mayo Methot, American actress (b. 1904)
 June 11 – Takuma Nishimura, Japanese general (executed) (b. 1899)
 June 13 – Ben Chifley, Australian politician, 16th Prime Minister of Australia (b. 1885)
 June 16 – Pyotr Pavlenko, Soviet writer and screenwriter (b. 1899)
 June 21 – Charles Dillon Perrine, American astronomer, discovered two moons of Jupiter (Himalia and Elara) (b. 1867)
 June 25 – Ferdinand Budicki, Croatian pioneer (b. 1871)
 June 27 – David Warfield, American stage actor (b. 1866)
 June 28 – Maria Pia Mastena, Italian Roman Catholic religious sister and blessed (b. 1881)
 June 29 – Juan Rivero Torres, Bolivian engineer and statesman (b. 1897)

July

 July 2 – Ferdinand Sauerbruch, German surgeon (b. 1875)
 July 3 – Tadeusz Borowski, Polish writer and journalist (b. 1922)
 July 9 
 Harry Heilmann, American baseball player (Detroit Tigers) and a member of the MLB Hall of Fame (b. 1894)
 Egbert Van Alstyne, American songwriter and pianist (b. 1878)
 July 13 – Arnold Schoenberg, Austrian composer (b. 1874)
 July 15 – Florentino Collantes, Filipino poet (b. 1896)
 July 17
 Charles Desplanques, French anarchist and journalist (b. 1877)
 Riad Al Solh, 2-Time Prime Minister of Lebanon (b. 1894)
 July 18
 Ludovico di Caporiacco, Italian arachnologist (b. 1901)
 Antti Juutilainen, Finnish farmer and politician (b. 1882)
 July 20
 King Abdullah I of Jordan (assassinated) (b. 1882)
 Elías Ahúja y Andría, Spanish philanthropist, politician, businessman and academic (b. 1863)
 Crown Prince Wilhelm of Prussia (b. 1882)
 July 23
 Robert J. Flaherty, American filmmaker (b. 1884)
 Philippe Pétain, French World War I marshal, leader of Vichy France, 78th Prime Minister of France (b. 1856)
 July 25 – Henrik Ramsay, Finnish politician and economist (b. 1886)
 July 26
 Juozas Gabrys, Lithuanian politician and diplomat (b. 1880)
 Maximilian Ritter von Pohl, German army and air force officer (b. 1893)
 July 30 – Sir Max Horton, British admiral (b. 1883)
 July 31 – Cho Ki-chon, Korean poet (b. 1913)

August

 August 14 – William Randolph Hearst, American newspaper publisher (b. 1863)
 August 15 – Artur Schnabel, Austrian-born Jewish classical pianist (b. 1882)
 August 16 – Louis Jouvet, French actor and director (b. 1887)
 August 19 – Władysław Wróblewski, Polish politician, scientist, diplomat and lawyer, provisional Prime Minister of Poland (b. 1875)
 August 21 – Constant Lambert, British composer (b. 1905)
 August 24
 Henri Rivière, French painter (b. 1864)
 Antonio Sánchez de Bustamante y Sirven, Cuban lawyer (b. 1865)
 August 26 – Bill Barilko, Canadian hockey player (b. 1927)
 August 28 – Robert Walker, American actor (b. 1918)

September

 September 1
 Louis Lavelle, French philosopher (b. 1883)
 Wols, German painter and photographer (b. 1913)
 September 2 – Antoine Bibesco, Romanian aristocrat, lawyer, diplomat and writer (b. 1878)
 September 3
 Ernestina Lecuona y Casado, Cuban pianist, musician, educator and composer (b. 1882)
 Enrico Valtorta, Italian Roman Catholic bishop of Hong Kong and reverend (b. 1883)
 Serge Voronoff, Russian-born French surgeon (b. 1866)
 September 5 – Mário Eloy, Portuguese painter (b. 1900)
 September 7
 Maria Montez, Dominican actress (b. 1912)
 John French Sloan, American artist (b. 1871)
 September 9
 Anton Golopenția, Romanian sociologist (b. 1909)
 Gibson Gowland, British actor (b. 1877)
 September 10 – Giuseppe Mulè, Italian composer and conductor (b. 1885)
 September 15 – Jacinto Guerrero, Spanish composer (b. 1895)
 September 17
 František Nušl, Czechoslovak astronomer and mathematician (b. 1867)
 Jimmy Yancey, American pianist and composer (b. 1898)
 September 18
 Márton Rátkai, Hungarian actor (b. 1881)
 Tomonaga Sanjūrō, Japanese philosopher (b. 1871)
 September 26 – Ioan Dimăncescu, Romania army officer (b. 1898)
 September 27 – Augusto de Vasconcelos, Portuguese surgeon, politician and diplomat, 57th Prime Minister of Portugal (b. 1867)
 September 29 – Thomas Cahill, American soccer coach (b. 1864)

October

 October 4 – Henrietta Lacks, American originator of the HeLa cell line (b. 1920)
 October 6 
 Will Keith Kellogg, American industrialist, founder of the Kellogg Company (b. 1860)
 Otto Fritz Meyerhof, German-born physician and biochemist (b. 1884)
 October 12 – Leon Errol, Australian-born actor and comedian (b. 1881)
 October 14 – Herman Charles Bosman, South African writer and journalist (b. 1905)
 October 16
 Liaquat Ali Khan, 1st Prime Minister of Pakistan (assassinated) (b. 1895)
 Saad Akbar Babrak, Afghan assassin (b. 1921 or 1922)
 October 17 – József Farkas, Hungarian nobleman, jurist and politician (b. 1857)
 October 23 – Fernando Poe Sr., Filipino actor (b. 1916)
 October 24
 Al Baker, American magician (b. 1874)
 Prince Carl, Duke of Västergötland (b. 1861)
 Clarence Stewart Williams, American admiral (b. 1863)
 October 25 – Amélie of Orléans, Queen consort of Portugal (b. 1865)
 October 26
 William S. Finucane, American businessman and politician (b. 1888)
 Óscar Pérez Solís, Spanish artillery officer, engineer, jurist and politician (b. 1882)
 October 28 – Mady Christians, Austrian actress (b. 1892)
 October 30 – Gustav Smedal, Norwegian jurist (b. 1888)

November
 November 3
 Aleksei Badayev, Soviet functionary (b. 1883)
 Richard Wallace, American film director (b. 1894)
 November 4 – Khelifa Belkacem, Algerian chaabi singer (b. 1907)
 November 5
 Agrippina Vaganova, Soviet ballerina (b. 1879)
 Reggie Walker, South African Olympic athlete (b. 1889)
 November 9
 Luigi Beltrame Quattrocchi, Italian Roman Catholic layman and blessed (b. 1880)
 Sigmund Romberg, Hungarian-born American composer (b. 1887)
 November 13 – Nikolai Medtner, Soviet pianist and composer (b. 1880)
 November 14 – Ludovico Chigi Albani della Rovere, Prince and Grand Master of the Order of Malta (b. 1866)
 November 15 – Robert Elliott, American actor (b. 1879)
 November 20
 Thomas Quinlan, British opera singer (b. 1881)
 Lou Skuce, Canadian cartoonist (b. 1886)
 November 23 – Enrichetta Alfieri, Italian Roman Catholic religious professed and blessed (b. 1891)
Ju Zheng, Chinese politician (b. 1876)
 November 25
 István Friedrich, 24th Prime Minister of Hungary (b. 1883)
 Harry B. Liversedge, American general (b. 1894)
 November 27 – Timrava, Slovak novelist (b. 1867)
 November 29 – Pramathesh Barua, Indian actor, director and screenwriter (b. 1903)

December

 December 1 – Felix Petyrek, Austrian composer (b. 1892)
 December 4 – Pedro Salinas, Spanish poet (b. 1891)
 December 5 – Shoeless Joe Jackson, American baseball player (Chicago White Sox) (b. 1887)
 December 6
 J. Edward Bromberg, Hungarian-born character actor (b. 1903)
 André Gobert, French tennis player (b. 1890)
 Harold Ross, American editor (b.1892)
 December 10 – Algernon Blackwood, British writer (b. 1869)
 December 11
 Christopher Addison, 1st Viscount Addison, British politician and physician (b. 1869)
 Selim Palmgren, Finnish composer, pianist and conductor (b. 1878)
 December 12 – Bill Patton, American actor (b. 1894)
 December 15 – Eric Drummond, 7th Earl of Perth, British diplomat, 1st Secretary-General of the League of Nations (b. 1876)
 December 19 
 Barton Yarborough, American actor (b. 1900)
 Umberto Cassuto, Italian rabbi and biblical scholar (b. 1883)
 December 20 – Anton Durcovici, Austro-Hungarian born Romanian Roman Catholic bishop and blessed (b. 1888)
 December 23 – Enrique Santos Discépolo, Argentine tango and milonga musician and composer (b. 1901)
 December 24 – Raffaele Rossetti, Italian engineer and military naval officer (b. 1881)
 December 31 – Maxim Litvinov, Russian revolutionary and Soviet diplomat (b. 1876)

Date unknown
 Ștefan Burileanu, Romanian general, engineer, inventor, and academic (b. 1874)

Nobel Prizes

 Physics – John Cockcroft and Ernest Walton
 Chemistry – Edwin McMillan and Glenn T. Seaborg
 Physiology or Medicine – Max Theiler
 Literature – Pär Lagerkvist
 Peace – Léon Jouhaux

References